Catholic Secular Forum (CSF) is a Mumbai-based Catholic institution. As of 2008 the General Secretary was Joseph Dias. It has been outspoken on a range of issues. The CSF said that "The Da Vinci Code is offensive as it hit certain basic foundations of the religion." In 2006, the group opposed the cover artwork of the American thrash metal band Slayer's album, Christ Illusion.

References

External links

Christian organisations based in India